Corcomroe may refer to

 Corcomroe (barony), a geographical region in County Clare, Ireland
 Corcomroe Abbey, an abbey in County Clare, Ireland
 Kings of Corco Modhruadh, rulers of an area roughly corresponding to the baronies of Corcomroe and Burren